Methandriol bisenanthoyl acetate (brand name Notandron-Depot), or methylandrostenediol bisenanthoyl acetate, also known as 17α-methylandrost-5-ene-3β,17β-diol 3β,17β-di(3-oxononanoate), is a synthetic, injected anabolic–androgenic steroid (AAS) and a 17α-alkylated derivative of 5-androstenediol. It is an androgen ester—specifically, the C3β,17β di(3-oxononanoate) (or dienanthoylacetate) ester of methandriol (17α-methyl-5-androstenediol)—and acts as a prodrug of methandriol in the body. Methandriol bisenanthoyl acetate is administered by intramuscular injection and, relative to methandriol, has an extended duration via this route due to a depot effect afforded by its ester.

See also
 Methandriol diacetate
 Methandriol dipropionate
 Methandriol propionate
 Bolandiol dipropionate

References

Androgen esters
Androgens and anabolic steroids
Androstanes
Carboxylate esters
Prodrugs
World Anti-Doping Agency prohibited substances